STC may refer to:

Education 
 Saint Theresa's College (disambiguation), any of several institutions
 St. Thomas' College, Matale, Sri Lanka
 S. Thomas' College, Mount Lavinia, Sri Lanka
 Scott Theological College, Kenya
 Sha Tin College, Hong Kong
 South Tama County Community School District, Iowa, United States
 South Texas College
 South Thames College
 South Tyneside College, Tyne & Wear, UK

Organizations 
 Saudi Telecom Company
 Scarborough Town Centre
 SeeBeyond Technology Corporation, originally Software Technology Corporation
 SHAPE Technical Centre
 Society for Technical Communication
 Solidaridad de Trabajadores Cubanos (Cuban Workers' Solidarity), a Cuban trade union
 Southern Transitional Council, a secessionist government in southern Yemen
 Space Transport Corporation
 Standard Telephones and Cables (1917–1991), a British corporation
 Standard Telephones and Cables F. C. (now Nortel F. C.), a football club
 STC Recordings, a record label
 STCmicro, a Chinese manufacturer of Intel MCS-51 compatible microcontrollers
 Stewart Information Services Corporation, New York Stock Exchange Ticker symbol STC
 Student Transportation of Canada
 Sydney Theatre Company, in Australia
 Sydney Turf Club, an Australian horse-racing venue operator.
 Storage Technology Corporation (StorageTek)

Science and technology 
 Sensitivity time control, a radar signal processing technique
 Silicon tetrachloride, a chemical compound
 Sound transmission class, a rating of how well a building partition attenuates airborne sound
 Space–time code, used to improve the reliability of data transmission in wireless communication systems
 Spike-triggered covariance, an analysis tool for characterizing a neuron's response properties
 Stability and Traction Control, a type of electronic stability control for vehicles
 Standard Test Condition, a measurement standard for PV solar panels

Transportation 
 Singapore Traction Company, a tram, trolleybus and motor operator in Singapore
 St. Cloud Regional Airport (IATA airport code)
 Saskatchewan Transportation Company
 Sistema de Transporte Colectivo, operates the Mexico City Metro mass transit system
 Supplemental type certificate, an approved major modification or repair to an existing type certified aircraft, engine or propeller
 Intercity STC, a Ghanaian transport company
 Sengkang MRT/LRT station (LRT station code)

Other uses 

 Short-title catalogue, a bibliographical resource
 Sonic the Comic, about the Sega video game character Sonic the Hedgehog
 The Soundtrack Channel